Khorasani Turkic or Khorasani Turkish is an Oghuz Turkic language spoken in the North Khorasan Province and the Razavi Khorasan Province in Iran. Nearly all Khorasani Turkic speakers are also bilingual in Persian. The closest language of Khorasani Turkic is considered Turkmen, with which it shares the eastern subbranch of Oghuz languages.

Geographic distribution
Khorasani Turkic is spoken in the Iranian provinces of North Khorasan near Bojnord and Razavi Khorasan near Sabzevar, Quchan. The Oghuz dialect spoken in Western Uzbekistan is sometimes considered a dialect of Khorasani Turkic.

Dialects
Khorasani Turkic is split into North, South and West dialects.  The northern dialect is spoken in North Khorasan near Quchan; the southern in Soltanabad, near Sabzevar; the western, around Bojnord.

Classification and related languages
Khorasani Turkic belongs to the Oghuz group of Turkic languages, which also includes Turkish, Azerbaijani, Gagauz, Balkan Gagauz Turkish, Turkmen and Salar.

Khorasani Turkic was first classified as a separate dialect by Iranian Azerbaijani linguist Javad Heyat in the book Tārikh-e zabān o lahcayā-ye Türki (History of the Turkic dialects). According to some linguists, it should be considered intermediate linguistically between Azerbaijani and Turkmen, although it is sufficiently distinct not to be considered a dialect of either. However, it is Turkmen that is considered the closest language to Khorasani Turkic, with which it shares the eastern subbranch of Oghuz languages.

Phonology

Consonants

Vowels

It can also be rounded by a following long . This may not happen for all speakers, and plurals never have any rounding.

Morphology

Nouns

Pluralization

Case
Nouns in Khorasani Turkic take a number of case endings that change based on vowel harmony and whether they follow a vowel or a consonant:

Possession
Possession is marked with a suffix on the possessed noun.

Pronouns
Khorasani Turkic has six personal pronouns.  Occasionally, personal pronouns take different case endings from regular nouns.

Verbs
Verbs are declined for tense, aspect, mood, person, and number.  The infinitive form of the verb ends in -max.

Examples
Excerpt from Tulu (1989) p. 90

Writing system 
Khorasani Turkic is not often written, but it may be with the Persian alphabet in the Perso-Arabic script.

References

Additional Resources
 (Persian)  (Downloadable from: https://turuz.com/storage/Language/2015/0861-_Dil_Ashnayi_Ba_Zabane_Turki_Xorasani_Celal_Qulizade_Merzeci.pdf / Archive)

See also 

 Bayat (tribe)

External links

Agglutinative languages
Oghuz languages
Languages of Iran
North Khorasan Province
Turkic languages